Valentin André Stanislas Gendrey (born 21 June 2000) is a French professional footballer who plays as a right-back for  club Lecce.

Club career
Gendrey made his professional debut with Amiens in a 1–0 Ligue 2 win over AS Nancy on 22 August 2020.

On 29 July 2021, he joined Lecce.

Personal life
Gendrey is of Guadeloupean descent and a distant cousin of the former French international footballer Olivier Dacourt.

References

External links
 
 

2000 births
Living people
People from La Garenne-Colombes
French people of Guadeloupean descent
French footballers
Association football fullbacks
France youth international footballers
Ligue 2 players
Championnat National 3 players
Serie A players
Amiens SC players
U.S. Lecce players
French expatriate footballers
French expatriate sportspeople in Italy
Expatriate footballers in Italy